Ralph Mitchell may refer to:

 Ralph Michell (died 1578), English politician
 Ralph J. Mitchell (1891–1970), U.S. Marine Corps general